Chalakudy is one of the 20 Lok Sabha (parliamentary) constituencies in the South Indian state of Kerala. It came into existence in 2008, following the delimitation of parliamentary constituencies based on recommendations of the Delimitation Commission of India. The constituency comprises seven assembly segments spread over two districts—Thrissur (3) and Ernakulam (4).

Assembly segments

Chalakudy Lok Sabha constituency comprises the following seven legislative assembly segments:

Kaipamangalam assembly segment came into existence in 2008, following delimitation of legislative assembly constituencies. Chalakudy, Kodungallur, Perumbavoor, and Angamaly were part of the erstwhile Mukundapuram Lok Sabha constituency.

Members of Parliament

As Crangannur in Thiru–Kochi

As Mukundapuram

As Chalakudy

Election results

General election, 2019
According to Election Commission, there are 11,85,268 registered voters in Chalakudy Constituency for 2019 Lok Sabha Election.

General election, 2014

See also
 Thrissur district
 Ernakulam district
 Mukundapuram (Lok Sabha constituency)
 Muvattupuzha (Lok Sabha constituency)

Notes

References

External links
 Election Commission of India
2019 General Election Chalakudy Constituency Live Results

Lok Sabha constituencies in Kerala
Politics of Thrissur district
Chalakudy